Sørfjorden is a village in the municipality of Rødøy in Nordland county, Norway.  The village is located on the eastern shore of the Sørfjorden, just south of Oldervika.  It is the location of Sørfjorden Church.  There is no road connection to the rest of Norway, even though it is located on the mainland.  The only access is by ferry to Kilboghamn and Jektvika.

References

Rødøy
Villages in Nordland